Naga National Party, is political party in the Indian state of Manipur. It works amongst the Naga majority in the state. The party favour a negotiated settlements of the conflicts in the North-East, unification of Naga groups and maintaining Naga identity.

The president of NNP is Ng Hungyo.

Political parties in Manipur
Political parties with year of establishment missing